Joseph Francis Page (October 28, 1917 – April 21, 1980), nicknamed Fireman and The Gay Reliever, was an American professional baseball relief pitcher.

Professional career
After spending time in the Yankees farm system, Page made his Major League Baseball debut on April 19,  where he began his career as a starter.

In his rookie season (starting 16 games, and relieving in three others), Page was voted to play in the All-Star Game and ended his season with over 100 innings pitched and a 4.56 ERA. The next season, Page suffered a shoulder injury, which led him to start only nine of the twenty games he pitched. That season, Page improved his ERA to 2.82, along with a 6–3 record.

In , Page split his time between closing and starting games, and he picked up three saves while posting a 3.57 ERA and a 9–8 record. In , Page spent practically the whole season in the bullpen and only started twice. He was voted to play in the All-Star Game once again, because of his 2.48 ERA and a 14–8 record. He also led the American League with 17 saves this season. (Note that the save statistic was not an official baseball statistic until 1969, and had not even entered common usage until well after Page did this; this feat is something that is only retroactively appreciated.  However, it was certainly appreciated at the time that Page played a greater than average role as the Yankees relief pitcher, at a time when there was no generally acknowledged "closing pitcher" role in baseball, and when starting pitchers were more often expected to finish complete games.)

He was fourth in the league in American League MVP voting. In the seventh game of the 1947 World Series he earned the save by inducing Brooklyn Dodgers hitter Eddie Miksis to hit into a series-ending double play.

In , Page finished second in the American League in saves. He also struck out 77 in 107.2 innings, pitched in the All-Star game for the third time, and led the league with 55 appearances.

The following season, Page had a 13–8 record and a 2.59 ERA. He finished first in the American League in saves with 27, again with no fanfare at the time because the save was not a recognized baseball statistic. He gave up 103 hits in 135.1 innings and struck out 99 batters. He was again named to play in the All-Star Game, and finished first in the league in three categories: games finished, games pitched, and saves. Page won the inaugural Babe Ruth Award for his performance in the 1949 World Series against the Brooklyn Dodgers, winning game three of the Series. He also finished third in the American League MVP voting.

Page struggled during the  season and was not part of the Yankee playoff roster. He was sent to the minors for the  season, and was released on May 16. He spent  in the minors, and was out of baseball altogether in 1953.  On April 12, Page was signed as a free agent by the Pittsburgh Pirates, appearing in seven games, posting an 11.17 ERA. Page was released by the Pirates on June 1, one week after his final appearance.

Page finished his eight-year career in the majors with a career record of 57–49, a 3.53 ERA, 76 saves, and 519 strikeouts in 790.0 innings pitched. Alvin Dark, a player in Page's day and later a big-league manager, credits Page's success as a relief pitcher in bringing greater attention to the role.

Page was a competent hitter for a pitcher, posting a .205 batting average (47-for-229) with 20 runs, 2 home runs and 26 RBI.

See also
 List of Major League Baseball annual saves leaders

References

External links

American League All-Stars
New York Yankees players
Pittsburgh Pirates players
Major League Baseball pitchers
Baseball players from Pennsylvania
Deaths from esophageal cancer
1917 births
1980 deaths
Butler Yankees players
Augusta Tigers players
Newark Bears (IL) players
San Francisco Seals (baseball) players
Kansas City Blues (baseball) players
Syracuse Chiefs players